Williams Medical Supplies Ltd (WMS) is a Wales-based manufacturer and retailer of medical products to the primary care and secondary care markets.  It is the largest supplier to general practice in the United Kingdom with a portfolio of products ranging from surgical instruments to pharmaceuticals.  Its Medical Services division undertakes testing and calibration of Medical equipment, health & safety audits and electrical PAT testing.

Founded in 1986, the company is based in Rhymney, south Wales and employs more than 160 people at its head office and in the field.  Williams Medical Supplies was voted one of the Best 100 Small Companies to Work for in 2005 and has achieved Investors in People Status.

In 2009, WMS was ranked at number 69 in the Sunday Times Deloitte Buyout Track 100 which ranks Britain's top private equity-backed companies with the fastest-growing profits over the previous two-year period.

The Williams Medical Supplies portfolio of companies also includes Merlin Medical Ltd and Seward Medical Ltd.

External links
 Official site
 icWales Article on the 2007 MBO

Retail companies of Wales
Health care companies established in 1986
1986 establishments in Wales
Welsh brands